Greek fires and similar terms may refer to:

Fires in Greece
Great Thessaloniki Fire of 1917 
2007 Greek forest fires
2009 Greek forest fires
2012 Chios Forest Fire 
2018 Attica wildfires 
2021 Greece wildfires

Other uses
Greek fire, an incendiary weapon 
Greek Fire (band), a rock band